This is a list of Mississippi State Bulldogs football players in the NFL Draft.

Key

Selections

References

Mississippi State

Mississippi State Bulldogs NFL Draft